Marie Chantal Nijimbere (born in 1983) is a serving Minister of Communication, ICT and Media in the Republic of Burundi appointed by the President of Burundi, General Evariste Ndayishimiye.

Background and education 
Nijimbere was born in 1983 in Cankuzo. She received a bachelor's degree in Economics and Administration from the University of Burundi in 2010 and she also had a master's degree in Business and Administration from Mount Kenya University.

Career 
Nijimbere has 10 years of experience in the civil society sector. She worked with the association of scouts and guides of Burundi where she managed finances and account, organized national events and supervised young people. From 2010 to 2014 she was in control of the finance of African scouting events. In 2017, she became the accountant of the African Scouting events that was held in that year. In June 2020, she was appointed as the Minister of Communication, ICT and Media by the President of the Republic of Burundi Evariste Ndayishimiye.

References 

Living people
1983 births
Burundian politicians
Women government ministers of Burundi
Burundian people
Government ministers of Burundi
Mount Kenya University alumni
University of Burundi alumni